Over the course of centuries, a multitude of national symbols and material items have arisen as uniquely Canadian or possessing uniquely Canadian characteristics. These symbols and items represent the culture of Canada—protectionism of that culture, identity, values, nationalism, and the  heritage of its inhabitants.

Themes and symbols of nature, pioneers,  trappers, and traders played an important part in the early development of Canadian symbolism. Modern symbols emphasize the country's geography, cold climate, lifestyles, and the Canadianization of traditional European and indigenous symbols.

A 2013 Statistics Canada survey found that more than 90% of those polled believed that the national flag and the Canadian Charter of Rights and Freedoms were the top symbols of Canadian identity. Next highest were the national anthem ("O Canada"),  the Royal Canadian Mounted Police, and ice hockey. A similar poll by Ipsos Reid in 2008 indicated that the maple leaf was the primary item that defines Canada, followed by ice hockey, the national flag, the beaver, the Canadarm, Canada Day, and Canadian Forces peacekeeping. A poll taken in 2022 determined that 55 per cent of respondents agreed the country's monarchy helps define Canadian identity and six in 10 felt it helps to differentiate Canada from the United States.

Predominant symbols 

Canada’s most well known symbol is the maple leaf, which was first used by French colonists in the 1700s. Since the 1850s, under British rule, the maple leaf has been used on military uniforms and, subsequently, engraved on the headstones of individuals who have served in the Canadian Armed Forces. The maple leaf is prominently depicted on the country's current and previous flags and on the country's coat of arms (or royal arms). The maple leaf has also been seen on the penny before circulation of that coin was stopped in 2013. Canada's official tartan, known as the "Maple leaf tartan", consists of four colours reflecting those of the maple leaf as it changes through the seasons—green in the spring, gold in the early autumn, red at the first frost, and brown after falling.

Other prominent symbols include the national motto, A Mari Usque Ad Mare  (From Sea to Sea), the sports of hockey and lacrosse, the beaver, Canada Goose, Canadian horse, the Royal Canadian Mounted Police, the Canadian Rockies, the Canadian parliamentary complex, the Canadarm, and, more recently, the Canadianization of totem poles and Inuksuks, With material items such as Canadian beer, maple syrup, tuques, canoes, nanaimo bars, butter tarts, and the Quebec dish of poutine being defined as uniquely Canadian. A six-pointed, hexagonal snowflake used as the insignia for the Order of Canada has come to symbolize Canada's northern heritage and diversity. The country's institutions of healthcare, military peacekeeping, the national park system, and the Charter of Rights and Freedoms are seen as uniquely Canadian by its citizens.

The Crown, displaying traditional cross pattées and fleurs-de-lis, symbolizes the Canadian monarchy and appears on the coat of arms, the governor general's flag, the coats of arms of many provinces and territories; the badges of several federal departments, the Canadian Armed Forces and Royal Military College of Canada, many regiments, police forces, on buildings, as well as some highway signs and licence plates. Also, the image of Queen Elizabeth II (Canada's erstwhile monarch) is on Canadian stamps, $20 bank notes, and all coins.

Official and de facto symbols 

The following is a list of official and de facto symbols, as recognized by the government of Canada. They are not shown in any order of precedence.

See also

Anthems and nationalistic songs of Canada
Events of National Historic Significance
Great Canadian Flag Debate
List of Canadian awards
 List of Canadian flags
National Historic Sites of Canada
Orders, decorations, and medals of Canada
Orders, decorations, and medals of the Canadian provinces
Persons of National Historic Significance
Regional tartans of Canada

References

Further reading

External links
 Canadian Heritage: Symbols of Canada (PDF)